A skeleton is a biological system providing support in a living organism.

Skeleton or skeletons may also refer to:

Science and computers
 Human skeleton, human anatomy
 Skeletonization (forensics), refers to the complete decomposition of the non-bony tissues of a corpse, leading to a bare skeleton
 n-skeleton, the subcomplex of a simplicial complex or CW complex consisting of all faces of or below a certain dimension
 Skeleton (category theory), in mathematics, every category has a skeleton in which no two distinct objects are isomorphic
 Skeleton (computer programming), a style of computer programming
 Algorithmic skeleton, a style of parallel programming based on simple high-level patterns

 Skeletal animation, a computer technique used to animate 3D characters
 Topological skeleton, a digital image processing technique used to detect objects and regions within images
 Morphological skeleton in digital image processing
 Class skeleton, an outline of a class used in software engineering
 Skeletal formula, in chemistry, the skeletal structure or skeleton of a molecule
 Straight skeleton, in geometry, is a method of representing a polygon
Skeletonizer (disambiguation), a common name for several species of moth

Music
 Skeletons (band), an American indie rock group

Albums
 Skeleton (Abe Vigoda album) or the title song, 2008
 Skeleton (Figurines album), 2005
 Skeletons (Danzig album), 2015
 Skeletons (Hawthorne Heights album), 2010
 Skeletons (Nothingface album), 2003
 Skeletons (Sirens and Sailors album) or the title song, 2013
 Skeletons (Wednesday 13 album) or the title song, 2008
 Skeletons, by Brothers Osborne, 2020
 Skeletons, by Seven Story Drop, 2008
 Skeletons, by Pop Evil, 2023

Songs
 "Skeleton" (song), by Donghae & Eunhyuk, 2014
 "Skeletons" (Dihaj song), representing Azerbaijan at Eurovision 2017
 "Skeletons" (Stevie Wonder song), 1987
 "Skeletons" (Yeah Yeah Yeahs song), 2010
 "Skeleton", by Bloc Party from Little Thoughts, 2004
 "The Skeleton", by Quasi from Field Studies, 1999
 "Skeletons", by James Arthur from Back from the Edge, 2016
 "Skeletons", by Travis Scott from Astroworld, 2018
 "Skeletons", by Tulisa from The Female Boss, 2012

Televisions and films
 "Skeletons" (CSI: Miami), an episode from season 4 of the American crime drama CSI: Miami
 "Skeletons", an episode of the fourth season of NCIS
 "The Skeleton", a 1979 episode of the TV sitcom The Ropers
 Skeletons (film), a 2010 film by Nick Whitfield
 Skeletons (1997 film), a television film by David DeCoteau
 The Skeleton, a fictional character from the novel Something Wicked This Way Comes

Games
 Skeleton (sport) (or tobogganing), a fast winter sliding sport
 Skeleton (Guitar Hero), a playable character in the Xbox 360 version of the video game Guitar Hero: World Tour
 Skeleton (Dungeons & Dragons), an undead creature from the Dungeons & Dragons fantasy roleplaying game
Skeleton+, an Atari 2600 video game in Activision Anthology

Other
 Skeleton (undead), in fantasy, an undead, animated skeleton
 Skeleton key, a type of key
 Skeleton watch, a type of watch where the gearing is visible
 Skeleton crew or staff, a reduced number of staff working off-hours or during a labour strike
 Skeleton Creek (disambiguation)
 Skeleton suit, a 19th-century fashion in boys' clothing
 Skeleton in the closet (idiom), an undisclosed negative fact about someone

See also
 Bone, a rigid organ that constitutes part of the vertebrate skeleton.
 Exoskeleton, an exterior skeleton
 Endoskeleton, an interior skeleton
 Hydroskeleton, a skeleton supported by fluid pressure
 Cytoskeleton, an element present in all cells of all domains of life 
 Lich, sometimes mistaken as a normal skeleton
 Skelethon, an album by Aesop Rock
 Skeletor, a fictional character in Masters of the Universe